"I'm Wise" is a 1906 popular song composed by Egbert van Alstyne, with lyrics by Harry Williams. It was recorded the following year by popular singer Clarice Vance.

1906 songs
American songs
Rags
Songs with music by Egbert Van Alstyne
Songs with lyrics by Harry Williams (songwriter)